In Riemannian geometry, the Cheeger isoperimetric constant of a compact Riemannian manifold M is a positive real number h(M) defined in terms of the minimal area of a hypersurface that divides M into two disjoint pieces. In 1970, Jeff Cheeger proved an inequality that related the first nontrivial eigenvalue of the Laplace–Beltrami operator on M to h(M). This proved to be a very influential idea in Riemannian geometry and global analysis and inspired an analogous theory for graphs.

Definition 

Let M be an n-dimensional closed Riemannian manifold. Let V(A) denote the volume of an n-dimensional submanifold A and S(E) denote the n−1-dimensional volume of a submanifold E (commonly called "area" in this context). The Cheeger isoperimetric constant of M is defined to be

 

where the infimum is taken over all smooth n−1-dimensional submanifolds E of M which divide it into two disjoint submanifolds A and B. The isoperimetric constant may be defined more generally for noncompact Riemannian manifolds of finite volume.

Cheeger's inequality 

The Cheeger constant h(M) and  the smallest positive eigenvalue of the Laplacian on M, are related by the following fundamental inequality proved by Jeff Cheeger:

 

This inequality is optimal in the following sense: for any h > 0, natural number k and ε > 0, there exists a two-dimensional Riemannian manifold M with the isoperimetric constant h(M) = h and such that the kth eigenvalue of the Laplacian is within ε from the Cheeger bound (Buser, 1978).

Buser's inequality 

Let M be an n-dimensional closed Riemannian manifold whose Ricci curvature is bounded below by −(n−1)a2, where a ≥ 0. Then

See also 

 Cheeger constant (graph theory)
 Isoperimetric problem
 Spectral gap

References 

 
 
 

 

Riemannian geometry